Şahin Giray, Shahin Khan Girai (1745–1787) was the last Khan of Crimea on two occasions (1777–1782, 1782–1783).

Life 
He was born in 1745 in Edirne. He was the son of Ahmed Giray and Saliha Sultan (daughter of Ahmed III) and he was the maternal great grandson of Mehmed IV and  Gülnuş Sultan.

He studied in Greece and Venice. He reputedly spoke the Crimean Tatar language as well as Ottoman Turkish, Italian and Greek. When he was 20, his uncle Crimean Khan Qırım Giray called him back to the Crimea from his foreign school whereupon he was installed as the Commander of Nogai Horde. In 1770, the Russian Empire won a great battle against the Ottoman Empire and sought an alliance with the Crimean Khanate against the Turks.  Selim Giray declined the proposal, precipitating a surprise attack by Russia against the Khanate. The Khan sent envoys to Saint Petersburg to sue for peace. During this mission, Catherine II met Şahin Giray and wrote of him:

"The Crimean Prince is the most gentle Tatar, I have ever seen. He's very talented, bronze-colored, good-looking, circumcised and writes poetry. He wants to see and learn everything."

In 1776, Şahin Giray succeeded his uncle to become Khan of Crimea. During his brief reign, he embarked on a program to re-build and modernise the Crimean Khanate. These reforms centred on the economy and government infrastructure, but included opening factories and moving the capital from Bakhchisaray to the important trade city of Caffa.

Eventually, under enormous pressure from Russia and facing the inevitability of defeat, he agreed to a Russian offer to incorporate the Khanate into the Russian Empire. As a result, he was compelled to move to Saint Petersburg, where he lived under house arrest. He appealed to be allowed to move to Edirne, where he had spent much of his childhood. In 1787, Russia and the Ottoman Empire agreed to allow him to move to Edirne. This move was not the retirement he was expecting because the Ottoman authorities saw him as a possible challenger to the imperial Ottoman throne.  He was moved under arrest to Constantinople and then Rhodes where he was executed later that year under the order of the Ottoman sultan Abdul Hamid I. 

Şahin Giray's family lived in Burgazada, Istanbul after his execution.

See also
Annexation of Crimea by the Russian Empire
Benjamin Aga

References

LAST CRIMEAN KHAN in TR written by Leonid Bahrevskiy Translated from Turkish

Crimean Khans
1745 births
1787 deaths
18th-century rulers in Europe
18th-century executions by the Ottoman Empire